Warner Bros. Home Entertainment Inc. (formerly known as Warner Home Video and WCI Home Video and sometimes credited as Warner Home Entertainment) is the home video distribution division of Warner Bros.

It was founded in 1978 as WCI Home Video (for Warner Communications, Inc.). The company launched in the United States with twenty films on Betamax and VHS videocassettes in late 1979. The company later expanded its line to include additional titles throughout 1979 and 1980.

History 
The company launched in the United States with twenty films on Betamax and VHS videocassettes in late 1979. The company later expanded its line to include additional titles throughout 1979 and 1980.

Warner Bros. began to branch out into the videodisc market, licensing titles to MCA DiscoVision and RCA's SelectaVision videodisc formats, allowing both companies to market and distribute the films under their labels. By 1985, Warner was releasing material under their own label in both formats. Titles from Warner Home Video were and continue to be distributed and manufactured by Roadshow Home Video worldwide except for Australia and New Zealand because of its film counterpart's films released by Village Roadshow.

Warner also experimented with the "rental-only" market for videos, a method also used by 20th Century Fox for their first release of Star Wars in 1982. Two known films released in this manner were Superman II and Excalibur. Other films released for rental use include Dirty Harry, The Enforcer, Prince of the City, and Sharky's Machine.

In 1990, Warner Home Video acquired the worldwide home video rights to the MGM/UA catalog. The $125 million purchase was used to finance MGM/UA's acquisition by the Pathé Communications Corporation. The intended 12½-year-long deal was cut short in February 2000, with MGM paying Warner Bros. $225 million to regain video rights to a number of its films. In exchange, Warner Bros. gained full control over the video rights to MGM's pre-1986 library, an asset the studio had acquired outright from Turner, but due to a pre-existing licensing deal with MGM, was originally expected to expire in 2001.

On December 20, 1996, Warner Home Video was one of the first major American distributors for the then-new DVD format, by releasing the films Assassins, Blade Runner: Director's Cut, Eraser, and The Fugitive on DVD in Japan and on March 24, 1997, in the United States with Blade Runner also being a launch title for the region there. Warner Bros. executive Warren Lieberfarb is often seen as "the father of DVD". Lieberfarb's successor, Warner Bros. executive James F. Cardwell was recognized in paving the way for WHV's strategic positioning in next generation technologies such as High Definition DVD (HD DVD), electronic sell-through and portable video. In 2003, Warner Home Video became the first home video releasing company to release movies only on DVD with no VHS equivalent.

In 2009, Warner Home Video introduced the Warner Archive Collection, which allows the public to order custom-made DVDs of rarely seen films and TV series from the Warner and Turner libraries. The films are also available as digital downloads. Warner Archive DVDs and downloads can be ordered online on Warner's website, on Amazon.com or Turner Classic Movies-affiliated DVD website Movies Unlimited.

On January 14, 2020, Universal and Warner Bros. Home Entertainment announced that they would partner on a 10-year multinational joint-venture, merging their physical operations in North America. On April 7, 2020, the European Commission approved the merger. The company was later named Studio Distribution Services, LLC.

References

External links 
 WarnerBros.com | Home Entertainment | Company

Warner Bros. Discovery subsidiaries
1978 establishments in California
Companies based in Burbank, California
Entertainment companies based in California
Entertainment companies established in 1978
Home video companies established in 1978
Home video companies of the United States
Home video distributors
Mass media companies established in 1978
1978 establishments in the United States